The third season of Full House, an American family sitcom created by Jeff Franklin, premiered on ABC in the U.S. on September 22, 1989, and concluded on May 4, 1990. The season was partially directed by Franklin and produced by Jeff Franklin Productions, Miller-Boyett Productions, and Lorimar Television, with Don Van Atta as the producer. It consists of 24 episodes, most of which were directed by Bill Foster.

Set in San Francisco, the show chronicles widowed father Danny Tanner, who, after the death of his wife Pam, enlisted his brother-in-law Jesse Katsopolis and his best friend Joey Gladstone to help raise his three daughters, D. J., Stephanie, and Michelle. In this season, Danny and Rebecca's talk show takes a spike in popularity, meanwhile Jesse and Rebecca continue dating while Jesse prepares to leave his rebellious ways in the past. Initially, it was planned that Becky would appear only in six episodes of season two, however, the producers found that the Tanner girls needed a mother figure. In the meantime, Joey searches for ways to launch his comedy career. The season also marks the first appearance of Comet, a dog the family adopts in "And They Call It Puppy Love". D. J. starts seventh grade and her first year of junior high and Stephanie enters the second grade.

By this season, the series' viewership increased, turning Full House into the most popular series of ABC's block TGIF; also, for the first time the series figured among the 30 highest-rated programs of the year. Critical reception was mixed, with critics regarding the sameness of the program, and praising towards the characters and actors performance.

Cast 

The season's main cast is John Stamos as Jesse, Bob Saget as Danny, Dave Coulier as Joey, Candace Cameron as D. J., Jodie Sweetin as Stephanie, and Mary-Kate and Ashley Olsen as Michelle. Additionally, Lori Loughlin returned as Rebecca "Becky" Donaldson, and, from this season, she had left the recurring cast to become part of the main cast. She appears in thirteen of the season's episodes.

The season's guest stars include Bobbie Eakes in "Breaking Up Is Hard to Do (in 22 Minutes)"; Doris Roberts as Claire, Danny's mother (replacing Alice Hirson, who played the role in the first season); Ed McMahon as himself, in the episode "Star Search"; Scott Baio in "Dr. Dare Rides Again"; and Mike Love of The Beach Boys in "Our Very First Telethon".

Reception and release

Ratings
The Los Angeles Times states in a December 1989 article that Full House was "the most popular series on Friday night and the most popular of all among the 2-to-11 year-old set" at the time, with an average of 28% of the TV audience in its time slot reported in March 1990. The season three ratings did enter in the Top 30 highest-rated programs for the first time, coming in at number 22 for the 1989–90 season.

Critical reception
David Hofstede in the guide 5000 Episodes and No Commercials and Donald Liebenson of Barnes & Noble cited the fact that Michelle says her catchphrase "You got it, dude" for the first time as highlight of the season. It will become one of the most popular catchphrases in American television. Jeffrey Robinson from DVD Talk said that season three did not included different things for the series, with exception of actors' "over-the-top performances, which alone would be bad, but together make for some fun jokes." Robinson stated, "Overall season three is a nice addition to the Full House series." Similarly, Currentfilm.com praised the characters development, and the actors performance, as well as the screenplay that offers "a nicer balance of snap and sap than prior seasons." BuzzFeed placed "Tanner's Island", "Our Very First Telethon", "Honey, I Broke the House", and "Fraternity Reunion" respectively at numbers 7, 8, 14, and 16 on its list of The 19 Most WTF Moments From Full House.

Episodes

DVD release
Warner Home Video released a DVD box set containing all third-season episodes on April 4, 2006 only on Region 1.

References 
 Notes 

General references 
 
 

Specific references

1989 American television seasons
1990 American television seasons
3